Valkendorf (Denmark) or Walkendorff (Sweden)  is a Danish and Swedish medieval noble family, which can be traced back to the 14th century with the arrival in Denmark of knight Heinrich (Henning) Valkendorf. The most prominent member of the Danish family was Christoffer Valkendorf, who served as Steward of the Realm during the early reign of Christian IV. Members of the family were major landowners on the island of Funen where they owned Glorup Manor for almost two hundred years. The Danish branch was extinct in 1747.

Denmark
It is likely that the Walkendorff family originates from Mecklenburg-Vorpommern, where remnants of a castle has been found in the small village of Walkendorf. Henning Valkendorf is first mentioned in Denmark in 1374. His son, Peder Valkendorf (mentioned 1378 and 1405)m a knight, was the grand father of Councillor of the Realm Hans Valkendorf (mentioned 1468 and 1498) and district judge Axel Valkendorf (died 1483).  Axel Valkendorf acquired Glorup Manor on Funen in 1479 and members of the family owned the estate until 1659. Notable members of the family include the statesman Christoffer Valkendorff. Members of the family have also owned the estates Søbogaard, Brandstrup and Tiselholt.

The Danish Valkendorf branch died out in 1747 with the passing of Major Børge Walkendorff.

Swedish branch
The Swedish Walkendorff branch was introduced at the Swedish House of Nobility as Nr 25 in 1664 through Christopher Walkendorff (1621-1690) after the cession of the Danish province Scania (Skåne) to Sweden.

Notable members

Denmark
 
 Christoffer Valkendorff (1525-1601), statesman
 Knud Valkendorf (died 1527), rector of University of Copenhagen
 Erik Valkendorf (died 1522), bishop
 Erik Valkendorf (c. 1523 - 1605), landowner
 Jørgen Henning Valkendorf (1661–1724), district governor of Rugård Amt

See also
 List of Swedish noble families
 Ellinge Castle - Christoffer Walkendorff was Ellinge's Manager from 1640-1690

References

 
Danish noble families
Swedish noble families